World Offshore Championship races in Turkey are organized in 20 rounds by Işıklar Holding. 
The 2011 schedule was as follows:

Results 
1.place: Stihl team (Kerem Tuncer-Alpay Akdilek) 3237 points
2.place: Beşiktaş Miele team (Murat Leki-Tuğberk Uca) 2332 points
3.place: GSYİAD Galatasaray team (Francesco Redaelli-Giovanni Cagagni) 1902 points

References

Motorboat racing
2011 in Turkish sport
Offshore
Motorsport in Turkey
Sports competitions in Turkey